The 1985–86 Scottish Second Division was won by Dunfermline Athletic who, along with second placed Queen of the South, were promoted to the First Division. Stranraer finished bottom.

Table

References

Scottish Second Division seasons
3
Scot